Dodge Hollow is a valley in the U.S. state of Missouri.

Dodge Hollow has the name of the local Dodge family.

References

Valleys of Barry County, Missouri
Valleys of Stone County, Missouri
Valleys of Missouri